Alfriston is a village and civil parish in the East Sussex district of Wealden, England. The village lies in the valley of the River Cuckmere, about four miles (6 km) north-east of Seaford and south of the main A27 trunk road and part of the large area of Polegate. The parish had a population of 829 at the 2011 census.

History

There is strong evidence of ancient occupation of the area, since several Neolithic long barrows have been discovered on the surrounding Downs; among them, to the west is the fairly well preserved Long Burgh.

The place-name 'Alfriston' is first attested in the Domesday Book of 1086, where it appears as Alvricestone. It appears as Alfrichestuna in a French document circa 1150. The name means 'Ælfric's town or settlement'.

One building of historical importance is the Star Inn. Originally a religious hostel built in 1345 and used to accommodate monks and pilgrims en route from Battle Abbey to the shrine of St Richard, patron saint of Sussex, at Chichester Cathedral, it became an inn in the 16th century. Wooden figures grace the upper part of the building, whilst in the front is a one-time ship's figurehead representing a red lion. The latter is connected with the Alfriston smuggling gang who used the inn as a base; their leader was transported to Australia in 1830. Another important historical building is Dean's Place Hotel which was built in the 17th century or earlier.

Governance
An electoral ward in the same name exists. This ward stretches north to Chalvington with Ripe and has a total population taken at the 2011 census of 2,321.

Churches

 
The Alfriston parish church, dedicated to St Andrew, has Saxon origins, although most of the building dates from the 14th century. It is known, because of its size, as the Cathedral of the South Downs. It sits on a small, flint-walled mound in the middle of "the Tye" (the local village green), overlooking the River Cuckmere, and is surrounded by the flowered graveyard in which the Nobel laureate Sir Peter Medawar and the Labour politician Denis Healey are buried. It is built in the form of a cross. Today it is part of the united benefice which includes St Michael's Church at Litlington and All Saints Church at West Dean.  Alfriston's former United Reformed Church is included in that grouping.

The village of Alfriston

The east side of the village lies by the River Cuckmere and is home to the village green, which is called the Tye. In the centre of the Tye is St. Andrew's Church. The 14th-century Alfriston Clergy House close by was originally a farmhouse but later became the vicarage. It is now maintained by the National Trust.  It was the very first property bought by the Trust, in 1896, and it is a classic example of a Wealden hall house with thatched roof and timber-framed walls.  It also has a tranquil garden and orchard on the banks of the Cuckmere. Also on the Tye is the Georgian Unitarian Chapel. The wooden sign for the village at the entrance to the Tye was carved by a previous vicar of the village who also repaired the Star Inn's red lion. The centre of the village is Market Square which contains a 15th-century market cross.

The village contains three pubs, the Star Inn, the Smugglers' Inn and the George Inn. A Channel 5 archaeology programme, Pub Dig, revealed evidence of long occupation of the site of the Smugglers' Inn, including signs of smuggling, animal butchery and neolithic activity at the rear of the building.  In 2021, the Star Inn featured in another Channel 5 programme, called Alex Polizzi: My Hotel Nightmare, which documented the renovation of the 15th century, 37-bedroom coaching inn.

The South Downs Way crosses the river in Alfriston, and then continues up onto the Downs.

During the week leading up to the August bank holiday weekend, there is the Alfriston Festival, which ends with a Grand Fair on the Tye, with the proceeds going to several local national charities. It is attended by a large number of people from many miles around. In December there is also an Alfriston Christmas Weekend. The village also has its own clay pigeon shooting club. The Alfriston Cricket Club has won the Cuckmere Valley League on nine occasions, with the earliest being 1920 and the most recent 2003.

The arts and Alfriston

In 1931 Eleanor Farjeon wrote the popular hymn "Morning Has Broken" in Alfriston; the hymn is supposedly about the beauty she saw around her in this village. The song was later recorded by Cat Stevens in the 1970s, reaching a wider audience.

The 1946 novel Uneasy Terms by crime and thriller writer Peter Cheyney is set mainly in and around Alfriston. The private detective Slim Callaghan stays in one of the pubs in Alfriston, which in the novel is called 'The Two Friars', whilst solving a murder at the nearby house 'Dark Spinney', home of the Alardyse family. The author describes the village thus: "Callaghan walked slowly through the open space at the end of Alfriston High Street. The afternoon sun shone on the old houses, and the tree in the middle of the little square threw a pleasant shadow." Several other local places are mentioned in the novel, among them Brighton, Eastbourne, Herstmonceux, Pevensey Bay, Rottingdean and Polegate. The book was made into a film in 1948, starring Moira Lister and Michael Rennie. Cheyney also mentions Alfriston in several other of his novels, including Dance without Music (1947).

Another well-known thriller-writer, Victor Canning, sets the prologue to his 1956 novel The Hidden Face (US Burden of Proof) in Alfriston. The hero Peter Barlow comes to the village to confront a resident, James Gurney Hansford, who has cheated his father and driven him to suicide. They fight. Later Hansford is murdered and Barlow wrongly convicted of the crime.

The 1964 film The Chalk Garden starring Sir John Mills, Hayley Mills and Deborah Kerr was filmed in and around the village.

Peter Sellers' 1962 film Waltz of the Toreadors was also filmed here.

Notable people 
 Dr June Goodfield (1927–) historian, scientist and writer
 Denis Healey, Baron Healey, CH, MBE, PC, FRSL (1917–2015 in Alfriston) a British Labour Party politician, Secretary of State for Defence 1964–1970, Chancellor of the Exchequer 1974–1979 and Deputy Leader of the Labour Party 1980–1983
 Edna Healey (1918 – 2010) author, lecturer and filmmaker. Wife of Denis.
 Albert Hilton (1862 in Alfriston – 1935) an English cricketer active from 1891 to 1895 who played for Sussex, appearing in 29 first-class matches
 Peter Medawar (1915–1987) and his wife are buried in Alfriston
 Elgar Pagden (1820–1880), first-class cricketer
 Jacqueline Wilson (1945– ) children's author of the Tracy Beaker franchise, lives in Alfriston

References

External links

 

 
Villages in East Sussex
Market towns in East Sussex
Civil parishes in East Sussex
Wealden District